Anton or Tony Olsson may refer to:

Anton Olson (1881–?), Swedish chess master
Anton Olsson (ice hockey) (born 2003), Swedish ice hockey player
Tony Olsson (born 1965), Swedish motorcycle speedway rider
Tony Olsson (criminal), convicted of the murder of two police officers
Anton Olsson, a character in the 1973 film Anton

See also
Anton Olsen (disambiguation)
Olsson (surname)